The 2021 Tirreno–Adriatico was a road cycling stage race that took place between 10 and 16 March 2021 in Italy. It was the 56th edition of Tirreno–Adriatico and part of the 2021 UCI World Tour.

Teams
Twenty-five teams participated in the race, including all nineteen UCI WorldTeams and six UCI ProTeams. Each team entered seven riders, for a total of 175 riders, of which 159 finished.

UCI WorldTeams

 
 
 
 
 
 
 
 
 
 
 
 
 
 
 
 
 
 
 

UCI ProTeams

Route

Stages

Stage 1
10 March 2021 — Lido di Camaiore to Lido di Camaiore,

Stage 2
11 March 2021 — Camaiore to Chiusdino,

Stage 3
12 March 2021 — Monticiano to Gualdo Tadino,

Stage 4
13 March 2021 — Terni to Prati di Tivo,

Stage 5 
14 March 2021 — Castellalto to Castelfidardo,

Stage 6
15 March 2021 — Castelraimondo to Lido di Fermo,

Stage 7
16 March 2021 — San Benedetto del Tronto to San Benedetto del Tronto, individual time trial (ITT)

Classification leadership table

 On stages 2 and 3, Caleb Ewan, who was second in the points classification, wore the violet jersey, because first-placed Wout van Aert wore the blue jersey as the leader of the general classification.
 On stage 4, Davide Ballerini, who was fourth in the points classification, wore the violet jersey, because first-placed Wout van Aert wore the blue jersey as the leader of the general classification, second-placed Mathieu van der Poel wore the jersey of the Dutch national road race champion, and third-placed Julian Alaphilippe wore the jersey of the UCI world road race champion.
 On stages 5 and 7, Mads Würtz Schmidt, who was second in the mountains classification, wore the green jersey, because first-placed Tadej Pogačar wore the blue jersey as the leader of the general classification. On stage 6, Würtz Schmidt, who dropped to third in the mountains classification, still wore the green jersey, because first-placed Tadej Pogačar wore the blue jersey and second-placed Mathieu van der Poel wore the jersey of the Dutch national road race champion.
 On stage 5, João Almeida, who was third in the young rider classification, wore the white jersey, because first-placed Tadej Pogačar wore the blue jersey as the leader of the general classification and second-placed Sergio Higuita wore the jersey of the Colombian national road race champion.
 On stages 6 and 7, Egan Bernal, who was second in the young rider classification, wore the white jersey, because first-placed Tadej Pogačar wore the blue jersey as the leader of the general classification.

Final classification standings

General classification

Points classification

Mountains classification

Young rider classification

Team classification

References

External links

2021
2021 UCI World Tour
2021 in Italian sport
March 2021 sports events in Italy